Tilkuh (also Romanized as Tīlkūh; also known as Tīleh Kūh and Tīlkū) is a village in Zhavehrud Rural District, in the Central District of Kamyaran County, Kurdistan Province, Iran. At the 2006 census, its population was 856, in 180 families. The village is populated by Kurds.

References 

Towns and villages in Kamyaran County
Kurdish settlements in Kurdistan Province